Mauricio Rosencof (born June 30, 1933) is a Uruguayan playwright, poet and journalist from Florida, Uruguay. Since 2005 he has been Director of Culture of the Municipality of Montevideo.

He was a founder of the Communist Youth Union and leader of the National Liberation Movement (Tupamaros) (MLN-T) and in 1972 was arrested and tortured. After the coup of 1973 he was held "hostage" with eight more prisoners. After twelve years in prison, he was released in 1985.
He has written several books. One of them, El regreso del Gran Tuleque, inspired the film El chevrolé. His 12-year tenure in prison with Eleuterio Fernández Huidobro and José Mujica was the basis for the film A Twelve-Year Night.

He lives in Montevideo.

Works
Medio mundo (2009)
Una gondola anclo en la esquina (2007)
El barrio era una fiesta (2005)
Leyendas del abuelo de la tarde (2004)
Las cartas que no llegaron (2000)
La margarita. Historia de amor en 25 sonetos (1994)
El Vendedor de Reliquias (1992)
Memorias del calabozo (1989, with Eleuterio Fernández Huidobro)
El hijo que espera (1988)
El regreso del Gran Tuleque (1987)
El lujo que espera (1986)
El combate del establo (1985)
El saco de Antonio (1985)
Los caballos (1967)
Las ranas (1961)
La valija (1961)
El gran Tuleque (1960)

References

1933 births
Jewish writers
Jewish socialists
Living people
Uruguayan dramatists and playwrights
Male dramatists and playwrights
Uruguayan male short story writers
Uruguayan short story writers
Uruguayan journalists
Uruguayan people of Polish-Jewish descent
Uruguayan guerrillas
Uruguayan torture victims
Uruguayan socialists
Uruguayan feminists
Male feminists
Prisoners and detainees of Uruguay
People from Florida Department
Premio Bartolomé Hidalgo